Zipoetes lineatus is a species of beetle in the family Cerambycidae. It was described by William Lucas Distant in 1898.

References

Agapanthiini
Beetles described in 1898